Jesús María Lacruz Gómez (born 25 April 1978) is a Spanish former professional footballer who played as a versatile defender.

He amassed La Liga totals of 272 games and 12 goals over the course of 12 seasons, representing Athletic Bilbao and Espanyol in the competition.

Club career
Born in Pamplona, Navarre, Lacruz's professional career began in 1994 with hometown side CA Osasuna in the second division, making his first appearance for the main squad aged just 16, and in 1997 he joined Athletic Bilbao, where he made his La Liga debut in a 1–0 home win against Atlético Madrid on 13 September. He was a regular starter for the latter in six of his nine seasons.

After 251 official games with Athletic – five in the 1998–99 edition of the UEFA Champions League – Lacruz moved to RCD Espanyol in the summer 2006 for €300,000 on a three-year contract, reuniting with former manager Ernesto Valverde. His first competitive appearance took place on 17 August in a 0–4 home loss to FC Barcelona for the Supercopa de España, and he scored his first goal for his new team against A.S. Livorno Calcio in a UEFA Cup match. In the same competition, he added another in a 2–1 win at SV Werder Bremen as the Catalans went on to lose the final to Sevilla FC on penalties; after having appeared in only ten league contests in the 2008–09 campaign, the 31-year-old left the Estadi Olímpic Lluís Companys.

On 14 January 2010, after several months without a club, Lacruz signed with modest Real Unión on a free transfer, until the end of the second division season, thus returning to the Basque Country. He appeared in 20 matches in his first year (all starts), in an eventual relegation.

International career
Lacruz was part of the Spanish squad that won the silver medal at the 2000 Summer Olympics in Sydney, losing the final to Cameroon. During two years, he appeared nine times for the under-21 team.

Honours

Club
Espanyol
UEFA Cup runner-up: 2006–07

International
Spain U23
Summer Olympic silver medal: 2000

References

External links

1978 births
Living people
Footballers from Pamplona
Spanish footballers
Association football defenders
La Liga players
Segunda División players
Segunda División B players
CA Osasuna B players
CA Osasuna players
Athletic Bilbao footballers
RCD Espanyol footballers
Real Unión footballers
Spain youth international footballers
Spain under-21 international footballers
Spain under-23 international footballers
Olympic footballers of Spain
Footballers at the 2000 Summer Olympics
Olympic medalists in football
Olympic silver medalists for Spain
Medalists at the 2000 Summer Olympics